Bulia similaris is a species of moth of the family Erebidae. It is found from southern California south to Baja California, east to southern Arizona, northwestern Sonora, western Texas and eastern Mexico.

The wingspan is about 32 mm.

References

External links

Moths described in 1936
similaris